"Hasta Abajo" (English: Up Down) is a song by Puerto Rican reggaetón recording artist Yandel from his second studio album De Líder a Leyenda (2013). It was written by Yandel and Marco Masís, produced by Tainy (Masís) and Mr. Earcandy. It was released as the second single from the album on October 14, 2013, following the release of "Hablé de Ti". The music video for the song was filmed in a desert of the South of California, under the direction of Carlos Pérez, premiered on October 28, 2013. The video has over 9 million views on YouTube.

Charts

Certifications

Release history

See also
List of Billboard number-one Latin songs of 2014

References

2013 singles
Yandel songs
Spanish-language songs
2013 songs
Songs written by Tainy
Songs written by Yandel
Sony Music Latin singles
Song recordings produced by Tainy